Jill Zwick (born June 12, 1944) was an American politician.

Born in Chicago, Illinois, Zwick went to Bradley University and Roosevelt University majoring in business. Zwick is a Republican and served on the Kane County Board. From 1981 to 1987, Zwick served in the Illinois House of Representatives.

Notes

|-

1944 births
Living people
Politicians from Chicago
Bradley University alumni
Roosevelt University alumni
Women state legislators in Illinois
County board members in Illinois
Republican Party members of the Illinois House of Representatives
20th-century American politicians
20th-century American women politicians